Slaughterhouse is the debut studio album by American garage rock band Ty Segall Band, released on June 26, 2012 on In the Red Records. It is the only studio album fully credited to Segall's band, who often perform with him live.

Background and recording
Regarding the recording process of Slaughterhouse and the role of the Ty Segall Band, Segall noted, "It’s the whole band. The Ty Segall Band. Like Twins, I played almost all of the parts myself. But yeah, we wanted to record a whole record with the band because it was so rad and so fun. It’s cool because we all wrote and played the songs together, it was totally collaborative. It was super fun! [...] I’d like to make five more records with those guys. Hopefully, throughout the years."

Track listing

Recording
Chris Woodhouse recorded the album from February 18 to February 21 at The Hangar in Sacramento, California.

Personnel
Ty Segall Band
 Ty Segall – lead vocals, guitar
 Emily Rose Epstein – drums
 Charles Moothart – guitar
 Mikal Cronin – bass guitar, backing vocals

Charts

References

2012 albums
Music of the San Francisco Bay Area
In the Red Records albums